Chen Dequan (born 30 August 1995) is a Chinese male short track speed skater.

International Competition Podiums

References

External links
Dequan Chen's profile , from http://www.sochi2014.com ; retrieved 2014-02-11.

1995 births
Living people
Chinese male short track speed skaters
Olympic short track speed skaters of China
Olympic silver medalists for China
Olympic bronze medalists for China
Olympic medalists in short track speed skating
Short track speed skaters at the 2014 Winter Olympics
Short track speed skaters at the 2018 Winter Olympics
Medalists at the 2014 Winter Olympics
Medalists at the 2018 Winter Olympics
People from Fushun
21st-century Chinese people